The 1972–73 daytime network television schedule for the three major English-language commercial broadcast networks in the United States covers the weekday and weekend daytime hours from September 1972 to August 1973. All times are Eastern and Pacific.

Talk shows are highlighted in yellow, local programming is white, reruns of older programming are orange, game shows are pink, soap operas are chartreuse, news programs are gold, children's shows are light purple and sports programs are light blue. New series are highlighted in bold.

Monday-Friday

ABC had a 6PM (ET)/5PM (CT) feed for their newscast

Saturday

In the News aired after all of CBS' Saturday morning shows except Fat Albert and the Cosby Kids, and CBS Children's Film Festival.
ABC debuts Multiplication Rock, a series of three-minute animated educational shorts shown five times each Saturday in between programs, on January 6.

Sunday

Multiplication Rock followed Curiosity Shop and Make a Wish on ABC starting January 7.

By network

ABC

Returning series
ABC Evening News
All My Children
American Bandstand
Bewitched 
The Bullwinkle Show 
Curiosity Shop 
The Dating Game
The Funky Phantom 
General Hospital
H.R. Pufnstuf 
Issues and Answers
The Jackson 5ive
Let's Make a Deal
Lidsville
Love, American Style 
Make a Wish
The Monkees 
The Newlywed Game
One Life to Live
Password
Split Second

New series
The ABC Saturday Superstar Movie
The Brady Bunch 
The Brady Kids
The Girl in My Life
Kid Power
Multiplication Rock
The Osmonds

Not returning from 1971-72
Here Come the Double Deckers 
Jonny Quest 
Lancelot Link, Secret Chimp 
The Reluctant Dragon & Mr. Toad Show 
The Road Runner Show
That Girl 
Will the Real Jerry Lewis Please Sit Down

CBS

Returning series
Archie's Funhouse 
Archie's TV Funnies
As the World Turns
The Bugs Bunny Show
Camera Three
Captain Kangaroo
CBS Children's Film Festival
CBS Evening News
CBS Morning News
The Edge of Night
Face the Nation
Family Affair 
The Guiding Light
Harlem Globetrotters 
Lamp Unto My Feet
Look Up and Live
Love is a Many Splendored Thing
Love of Life
Match Game 
Sabrina the Teenage Witch 
Search for Tomorrow
The Secret Storm
Sunrise Semester
Where the Heart Is

New series
The $10,000 Pyramid
The Amazing Chan and the Chan Clan
Fat Albert and the Cosby Kids
The Flintstone Comedy Hour
Gambit
Hollywood's Talking
The Joker's Wild
Josie and the Pussycats in Outer Space
The New Scooby-Doo Movies
The Price Is Right
The Vin Scully Show
The Young and the Restless

Not returning from 1971-72
The Amateur's Guide to Love
The Beverly Hillbillies 
Gomer Pyle, USMC 
Groovie Goolies 
Help!... It's the Hair Bear Bunch!
The Lucy Show 
The Monkees
My Three Sons 
The Pebbles and Bamm-Bamm Show
Tom and Jerry 
You Are There

NBC

Returning series
Another World
Concentration
Days of Our Lives
Dinah's Place
The Doctors
The Hollywood Squares
Jeopardy!
The Jetsons 
Meet the Press
NBC Nightly News
NBC Saturday Night News
NBC Sunday Night News
The New Pink Panther Show
Return to Peyton Place
Sale of the Century
Somerset
Three on a Match
Today
The Underdog Show 
The Who, What, or Where Game

New series
Around the World in 80 Days
Baffle
The Barkleys
The Houndcats
The Roman Holidays
Runaround
Sealab 2020
Talking with a Giant
The Wizard of Odds

Not returning from 1971-72
Barrier Reef
Bright Promise
The Bugaloos
Deputy Dawg
Doctor Dolittle 
Take a Giant Step
Mr. Wizard
The Woody Woodpecker Show

See also
1972-73 United States network television schedule (prime-time)
1972-73 United States network television schedule (late night)

Sources
Castleman & Podrazik, The TV Schedule Book, McGraw-Hill Paperbacks, 1984.

United States weekday network television schedules
1972 in American television
1973 in American television